Thamisanqa Molepo (born January 21, 1970) is a German actor.

Filmography

Film
 Vietato ai minori (1992)
 The Teddy Bear (1994)
 Concrete Romance (2007)
 Tutto tutto niente niente (2012)
 The Face of an Angel (2014)

Television
 Bianco e Nero - Altri particolari in cronaca... (1990)
 Classe di ferro (1991)
 Quelli della speciale (1992)
 Die Fremde (1994)
 Nati ieri (2007)
 Ho sposato uno sbirro (2008)
 Tutta la verità (2009)
 Cugino & cugino (2010)
 Anita Garibaldi (2012)
 Suburra: Blood on Rome (2020)

References 

1970 births
Living people
German people of South African descent